Manal Al Dowayan ( Manāl aḍ-Ḍawayān; born 1973) is a Saudi Arabian contemporary artist, best known for her installation piece Suspended Together from the Home Ground Exhibition at the Barjeel Art Foundation in 2011. She has shown work in a number of shows including the 2012 Soft Power show  at Alan Art Center  in Riyadh, Saudi Arabia, the 2013 Journey of Belonging, a solo show at Athr Gallery  in Jeddah, Saudi Arabia, the 2017 100 Masterpieces of Modern and Contemporary Arab Art in  Paris, France, as well as having her work exhibited in the 2014 USA Biennial in Houston, the  2015 P.3: Prospect New Orleans USA Biennial  Notes For Now, and the Venice Biennale in the Future of a Promise Exhibition. Her work spans many mediums from photography to installation and focuses on a progressive examination and critique women's roles in Saudi society.

Early life 
Al Dowayan was born in  1973 in Dhahran in Saudi Arabia's Eastern Province. She attended university, graduating with a Masters in Systems Analysis and Design.  She began her career working for an oil company before transitioning full-time to an artistic practice which primarily examines personal and political issues related to women's rights in the context of  ultra-conservative Saudi Arabian laws that include banning women from travelling, driving, or speaking a woman's name in public. Manal Al Dowayan currently resides in London, England where she is working on her Masters in Contemporary Art Practice in the Public Sphere at the Royal College of Art in London.

Photography
Manal Al Dowayan's early work primarily utilized black and white photography, including images from her I AM collection, Drive-By Shootings, and Nostalgia Carries Us. The I Am collection from 2005 was inspired by a speech given by King Abdullah Al Saud when he took the Saudi throne in 2005 in which he emphasized the importance of women's participation in building and enriching Saudi society. The controversial statement was interpreted in many ways by critics both for and against women's rights. Al Dowayan, from the statement, was inspired to photograph the women she believed the king was referring to from engineers to mothers to scientists, her series promoted the visibility and importance of Saudi Arabian women. Photographs from the Drive-By Shootings collection (2011) demonstrate the difficulty female artists working in Saudi Arabia face as their public movements are heavily restricted by the government. As a female, Al-Dowayan could not legally drive, but had a male drive her as she took photographs from the passenger seat of the moving vehicle. The resulting blurred images emphasize that she cannot simply step out of the car in order to create her art, but is subject to maintaining gender-appropriate behavior as an aspect of her creative process.

Installation art

In 2012 Al Dowayan's installation work was featured in the Edge of Arabia show We Need to Talk in Jeddah, Saudi Arabia. The show highlighted the need for progressive reform in Saudi Arabia as perceived by the artists. At the time it was the largest and most radical exhibit of contemporary Saudi artists, all of whom ran the risk of political backlash for their dissident artistic expressions. Al Dowayan's work Esmi My Name featured larger than life wooden worry beads with the names of women painted on them, hung from wool rope woven by Bedouin women. Saudi Arabians believe to utter a woman's name in public is a shameful or embarrassing taboo, casting Saudi women into obscurity and removing their unique identity, which according to Al Dowayan  "is deeply linked to several elements of an individual's personality and one's name is integral among these elements thus by making women's names public. Al Dowayan's work seeks to question and change women's roles and treatment in Saudi society.

Among Al-Dowayan's most well-known work is Suspended Together (2011), a series consisting of 200 white fiberglass doves suspended from the ceiling. Each dove, a traditional symbol of freedom, has reproduced on it a  permission-to-travel document that all Saudi women must have in order to travel. The certificate must be issued and signed by their appointed male guardian, be it their father, brother, or husband. The certificates Al Dowayan chose to reproduce were sent to her from a variety of Saudi women. The certificates range from six months to sixty years old, documenting a history of women's restricted rights. Al Dowayan describes the piece: "In this installation of doves, I explore the concept of suspended movement. Many leading women from Saudi, wonderful scientists, educators, engineers, artists and leaders, have donated their papers to be included in this artwork. These women are breaking new ground and achieving for their society, but when it comes to travel they are still treated 'like a flock of suspended doves.'"

Al-Dowayan's work has been exhibited at the British Museum, Los Angeles County Museum of Art (LACMA) and Mathaf: Arab Museum of Modern Art in Qatar among others.

Publications

Home Ground Contemporary Art from the Barjeel Art Foundation - Published in Canada in 2015 by The Aga Khan Museum - 

Color and Line - The Naqvi Collection - 

"Hitting the Road (Driving)" - By Manal AlDowayan - "The Forecast Issue: A View Beyond The Horizon," Issue 07, 2018 - Published by The Monocle Magazine.

"I Am" – By Manal AlDowayan, the "Visual Research and Social Justice" special issue of Studies in Social Justice Journal. Published December 2017.

Imperfect Chronology: Arab Art from the Modern to the Contemporary - Works from the Barjeel Foundation - Edited by Omar Kholeif with Candy Stobbs - Published by Whitechapel Gallery, London, UK, 2015 - 

Do It (in Arabic) - Edited by Hans Ulrich Obrist and Hoor AlQassimi - Published by the Sharjah Art Foundation 2016 -

Awards
2014 Arab Women Awards in Art
2019 Manal was named as one of the BBC 100 Women, a list of 100 inspiring and influential women from around the world, for 2019.

References

External links

1973 births
Living people
Saudi Arabian women artists
Saudi Arabian contemporary artists
Manal
21st-century women artists
People from Dhahran
BBC 100 Women